Eric Merton Roach  (3 November 1915 – 18 April 1974) was a Tobagonian poet and playwright. He published some early writing under the pseudonym Merton Maloney.

Life
Roach grew up in Mount Pleasant, Tobago:

Between 1949 and 1955, his poetry was frequently broadcast on the BBC programme Caribbean Voices.

In 1960s, Roach began to gain an international reputation. However, he became overwhelmed and depressed, and committed suicide in 1974, drinking insecticide before swimming in the ocean.

Work

Plays
 Belle Fanto: A Medium-length Play in 3 Acts, 1967
 Letter from Leonora, 1968
 A Calabash of Blood, 1971
 New Dancers in the Dooryard (undated)

Poems
 The Flowering Rock: Collected Poems 1938–1974, Peepal Tree Press, 1992

Plays: performance history

Belle Fanto 
Trinidad and Tobago Secondary Schools Drama Festival

 1971: St. George's College (Trinidad and Tobago) directed by Slade Hopkinson.
 1973: Palo Seco Government Secondary (Trinidad and Tobago) directed by B.T. Harry.
 1982: Cowen Hamilton Secondary (Trinidad and Tobago) directed by Victor Edwards.
 1988: San Fernando West Senior Comprehensive (Trinidad and Tobago) directed by Garvin McClean.
 1989: Signal Hill Senior Comprehensive School (Trinidad and Tobago) directed by Cherryll Uzoruo.
 1992: Aranguez Junior Secondary School (Trinidad and Tobago) directed by Susan Crichlow.
 1993: Signal Hill Senior Comprehensive School (Trinidad and Tobago) directed by Cherryll Uzoruo.
 1997: St. George's College (Trinidad and Tobago) directed by Rawle Carrington.
 1999: Tranquillity Government Secondary (Trinidad and Tobago) directed by Karen Griffith.
 2002: Cowen Hamilton Secondary School (Trinidad and Tobago) directed by Iezora Edwards.

Theatre companies
The following theatre companies performed Belle Fanto:

 San Fernando Theatre Workshop, directed by James Lee Wah
 Trinidad Theatre Workshop, directed by Derek Walcott
 The Tobago Drama Guild, directed by  Peter "Thabiti" Wheeler.

A Calabash of Blood 

 2019: The University of the West Indies, Department of Creative and Festival Arts, directed by  Neriah Alfred 
 2020: The Tobago Drama Guild, directed by Peter "Thabiti" Wheeler.

References

Further reading
 Laurence A. Breiner, Black Yeats: Eric Roach and the Politics of Caribbean Poetry, Peepal Tree Press, 2008

External links
 Al Creighton, Glorifying African survivals, August 22, 2010
 Andre Bagoo, "I am the Archipelago": Eric Roach and Black Identity, February 28, 2015
 Eric Roach and the Flowering Rock
 Eric Roach manuscripts at the University of the West Indies

1915 births
1974 deaths
20th-century male writers
20th-century poets
1974 suicides
Deaths by poisoning
Male dramatists and playwrights
Male poets
People from Tobago
Suicides in Trinidad and Tobago
Trinidad and Tobago dramatists and playwrights
Trinidad and Tobago male writers
Trinidad and Tobago poets